Papilla (Latin, 'nipple') or papillae may refer to:

In animals
 Papilla (fish anatomy), in the mouth of fish
 Basilar papilla, a sensory organ of lizards, amphibians and fish
 Dental papilla, in a developing tooth
 Dermal papillae, part of the skin
 Major duodenal papilla, in the duodenum
 Minor duodenal papilla, in the duodenum
 Genital papilla, a feature of the external genitalia of some animals
 Interdental papilla, part of the gums
 Lacrimal papilla, on the bottom eyelid
 Lingual papillae, small structures on the upper surface of the tongue 
 Renal papilla, part of the kidney

In plants and fungi
 Papilla (mycology), a nipple-shaped protrusion in the center of the cap
 Stigmatic papilla, part of the stigma (botany)

See also

 Blister, a small pocket of body fluid within the upper layers of the skin
 Papillary muscle, a muscle in the heart
 Papilloma, a benign epithelial tumor
 Papule, a circumscribed, solid elevation of skin with no visible fluid